Donna L. Farber is the Chief of Surgical Sciences, George H. Humphreys, II Professor of Surgical Sciences, and Professor of Microbiology and Immunology at Columbia University. Her research focuses on transplant immunology and memory T-cells.

Education and career 

Farber received her B.S. in microbiology from the University of Michigan and her Ph.D. in biochemistry and molecular biology from the University of California Santa Barbara. She did postdoctoral research at Yale University and at the Pasteur Institute in Paris, France.

Career 
She joined the faculty at the University of Maryland in 1996. In 2010, she moved to Columbia University.

In 2019, she was elected as a fellow of the American Association for the Advancement of Science.

References 

Fellows of the American Association for the Advancement of Science
Columbia University faculty
University System of Maryland faculty
American immunologists
Year of birth missing (living people)
Living people
University of Michigan alumni
University of California, Santa Barbara alumni